Kill or capture may refer to:

 Kill or Capture (Alexander book), a 2011 book by Matthew Alexander
 Kill or Capture (Klaidman book), a 2012 book by Daniel Klaidman
 USA kill or capture strategy in Iraq, a 2007 United States strategy
 Joint Prioritized Effects List, a list of individuals who coalition forces in Afghanistan try to capture or kill

See also

Wanted Dead or Alive (disambiguation)